Asror Akramkhanovich Vohidov (born 20 October 1995) is a Tajikistani professional boxer. As an amateur, he won a gold medal at the 2011 Junior World Championships, and later competed at the 2014 and 2018 Asian Games.

Medals 
 In the 2011 AIBA Junior World Championships Asrorov won a gold medal at the Junior World Championships. He was 16.

Results

AIBA Junior World Boxing Championships, Astana 2011

Defeated Vladislav Krasnosheyn (Russia) 20-9

References 
 
 Asror Vohidov, Tajikistan's new boxing sensation AIBA

1995 births
Living people
Tajikistani male boxers
Bantamweight boxers
Boxers at the 2014 Asian Games
Boxers at the 2018 Asian Games
Asian Games competitors for Tajikistan
Competitors at the 2013 Summer Universiade
People from Isfara
Southpaw boxers